Nhava Sheva railway station is a proposed railway station in Navi Mumbai's Raigad district, Maharashtra. Its code is NHVSV. It will serve JNPT and  Nhava Sheva area of Navi Mumbai. The station proposal includes two platforms.

References

Railway stations in Raigad district
Mumbai CR railway division
Transport in Navi Mumbai
Proposed railway stations in India
Mumbai Suburban Railway stations
Proposed infrastructure in Maharashtra